Nagytálya is a village in Heves County, Hungary. As of 2015, it has a population of 851, and 931 as of the 2021 estimate.

History
The earliest written record of the village dates back to 1232.

Demographics
According the 2011 census, 86.0% of the population were of Hungarian ethnicity, 0.3% were German, and 14.0% were undeclared (due to dual identities, the total may be higher than 100%). The religious distribution was as follows: 49.9% Roman Catholic, 6.2% Calvinist, 18.8% non-denominational, and 24.2% unknown.

References

Populated places in Heves County